High Bar Harbor is a neighborhood and unincorporated community located in the north-westernmost portion of Long Beach Township, in Ocean County, New Jersey, United States. The area is on Long Beach Island, west of Barnegat Light.

The area has no beaches of its own, however, residents have a less than 10 minute walk to the beaches of Barnegat Light and must display Barnegat Light beach badges for access in season. 

The 400 homes on the lagoons were developed in the mid-1950s.  As the section is surrounded on three sides by water, almost all of the homes are on the water or have water access.  The neighborhood has a network of canals leading from Barnegat Bay and is thus popular with boaters.  While some residents are year-round inhabitants, the majority of homes are only occupied during the summer season.  The neighborhood contains mostly residences and is known as a quiet, secluded, and exclusive area.  Residents/home owners include sports coaches, lawyers, IT/Cloud executives and at least one judge.

References

External links
 High Bar Harbor: General Information

Long Beach Island
Long Beach Township, New Jersey
Unincorporated communities in Ocean County, New Jersey
Unincorporated communities in New Jersey